Lophocampa alternata is a moth of the family Erebidae. It was described by Augustus Radcliffe Grote in 1867. It is known from Cuba.

References

Lophocampa alternata at BHL

alternata
Moths described in 1867
Endemic fauna of Cuba